Saint Bertha of Artois or Saint Bertha of Blangy (mid 7th century – 4 July 725) was a Frankish and Anglo-Saxon Abbess of noble blood.

Life
Saint Bertha was the daughter of Count Rigobert, the Mayor of the Palace under King Clovis II prior to Ebroin. Her mother Ursana, was the daughter of the King of Kent (in England).

At the age of twenty Bertha married Siegfried or Sigfrid, a relation of the king. When her husband Siegfried died in 672, after nearly twenty years of marriage and five daughters, Bertha was determined to become a Religious. In the year 682 or 685 Bertha had founded a convent at Blangy, Artois  (now Blangy-sur-Ternoise). She retreated there with her two eldest daughters, Deotila and Gertrude. Later, her daughter Deotila succeeded her as Abbess, when Bertha retired to live the life of a recluse, solely devoted to prayer. St Bertha died at an advanced age of natural causes on 4 July 725. Her feast day is celebrated on 4 July. (See "Ste. Berthe et son Abbaye de Blangy", Lille, 1892).

Hagiography
Two buildings which Bertha constructed had fallen down, but an angel in a vision guided her to another spot, and there after many difficulties a nunnery was built, which she entered with her two eldest daughters, Deotila and Gertrude.

A still later legend represents Gertrude as much persecuted by the attentions of a great noble, Roger, who wished to marry her by force, but she was saved from his violence by her mother's firm courage and trust in God.

Some time before her death Bertha is said to have resigned her office of abbess and to have shut herself up in a little cell built against the church wall.

The whole story of St Bertha, as her biographers agree, is of a very late date but not entirely legendary.

References

Further reading
Herbert J. Thurston and Donald Attwater, eds. "Butler's Lives of the Saints," vol. 3. Allen, TX: Christian Classics, 1956, pp 14–15.
Ferdinand Holböck, "Married Saints and Blesseds: Through the Centuries," San Francisco: Ignatius Press, 2002, 400 pp, 
"Lives of The Saints, For Every Day of the Year," edited by Rev. Hugo Hoever, S.O.Cist., Ph.D., New York: Catholic Book Publishing Co., 1955, 511 pp

External links
Catholic Online-Saints & Angels: St. Bertha
Saint of the Day, July 4:  Bertha of Blangy at SaintPatrickDC.org

725 deaths
Frankish abbesses
Christian female saints of the Middle Ages
Angelic visionaries
7th-century Frankish nobility
8th-century Frankish saints
7th-century Frankish nuns
8th-century Frankish nuns
Year of birth uncertain